Columbia Township is one of eleven townships in Jennings County, Indiana, United States. As of the 2010 census, its population was 868 and it contained 411 housing units.

Columbia Township was established in 1817.

Geography
The streams of Square Run and Wolf Creek run through this township.

Unincorporated towns
 Zenas

Adjacent townships
 Marion Township, Decatur County (north)
 Jackson Township, Ripley County (northeast)
 Otter Creek Township, Ripley County (east)
 Campbell Township (south)
 Sand Creek Township (west)
 Sand Creek Township, Decatur County (northwest)

Cemeteries
The township contains three cemeteries: Cornell, Old Zenas, and Zenas.

References
 
 United States Census Bureau cartographic boundary files

External links
 Indiana Township Association
 United Township Association of Indiana

Townships in Jennings County, Indiana
Townships in Indiana